Tscherim Soobzokov (24 August 1924 – 9 September 1985) was a Circassian spy, politician, soldier, and an anti-Soviet pro-independence activist. He rose to prominence in the New Jersey Democratic Party and the Circassian community in Paterson, New Jersey. During the Cold War, Soobzokov served the CIA as an anti-Soviet operative.

He was accused of collaborating with Nazi Germany during the invasion of the Soviet Union's North Caucasus before coming to the United States, but denied these allegations and sued CBS and The New York Times, and won. Soobzokov was murdered by a pipe bomb at his house, allegedly by the Jewish Defense League. He was publicly supported by Pat Buchanan and Congressman Robert Roe.

Background 
According to the far-right organization Jewish Defense League, during World War II in August 1942 he recruited Circassians in 1943-1944 to the Wehrmacht, and in early 1945, he was promoted to lieutenant of the SS. Richard Breitman also claimed that Soobzokov had ties to the SS. Witnesses said he actively participated in the rounding-up and mass executions of Jews and Communists. Soobzokov was admitted into the United States in 1955. In 1969

In 1969, a man named Mahamet Perchich wrote letters to the  Immigration and Naturalization Service, claiming Soobzokov had told a Palestinian refugee camp chief that he'd killed so many Jews during the war that if they were still alive, the blood of all Palestinians would not be enough for them to drink.

In 2006, declassified documents of the Central Intelligence Agency (CIA) confirmed that Soobzokov had been a CIA agent in Jordan. This was part of a wider post-World War II CIA program. Soobzokov had confidentially admitted to the CIA that he had indeed participated in an execution unit and hunted for Jews and Communists.

In 1977 book called ″Wanted: The Search for Nazis in America″ by Howard Blum, accused Soobzokov of participating in the mass murder of Jews and Communists in the Caucasus region. Federal officials investigated this allegation. However, in 1979, a federal grand jury found no grounds to indict Soobzokov, then the chief purchasing inspector for Passaic County. He was also cleared of charges he hid his involvement with the Waffen-SS since the CIA had already know about his membership in the organization.

Following the dismissal of his case, several radical Jewish groups urged violence against Soobzokov. On 15 August 1985, a pipe bomb was detonated outside Soobzokov's home in Paterson, New Jersey critically injuring him and destroying his right foot. Soobzokov died of his wounds in the hospital on 9 September 1985. Hours before the bombing, Soobzokov had reported that two people tried to run him over. An anonymous caller claiming to represent the Jewish Defense League (JDL) said they had carried out the bombing. A spokesman for the JDL later denied responsibility. No one was ever charged with leaving either bomb, but Aslan Soobzokov (Tscherim's son) has twice sued the federal government over its investigation. The bombing was linked by the FBI to a similar bomb attack on Elmārs Sproģis, that took place in Long Island on the day Soobzokov died.

The Jewish Defense League denied having killed Soobzokov, but applauded his death as a "righteous act". "I don't know who did it, we didn't do it, but we applaud the action 100 percent," their spokesperson said." We'll lose no sleep over it."

See also 
List of unsolved murders
Waffen-SS foreign volunteers and conscripts
Wehrmacht foreign volunteers and conscripts

References

External links
Historian Richard Breitman's file on Soobzokov
Soobzokov at Find A grave
TSCHERIMSOOBZOKOV.COM, operated by Soobzokov's son, Aslan T. Soobzokov

1924 births
1985 deaths
1985 murders in the United States
Assassinated Nazis
Circassian collaborators with Nazi Germany
Circassian people of Russia
Holocaust perpetrators in Russia
Deaths by explosive device
Male murder victims
North Caucasian independence activists
People from Takhtamukaysky District
People of the Central Intelligence Agency
Russian collaborators with Nazi Germany
Soviet emigrants to the United States
SS officers
Unsolved murders in the United States
Waffen-SS foreign volunteers and conscripts
New Jersey Democrats
Murdered CIA agents
People murdered in New Jersey

Russian anti-communists